Kali Ranjan Deb is a Bharatiya Janata Party politician from Assam. He has been elected in Assam Legislative Assembly election in 1991, 1996 and 2001 from Katigorah constituency. He was one of the first politicians from BJP-Assam to have been nominated thrice consecutively.

References 

Bharatiya Janata Party politicians from Assam
Assam MLAs 1991–1996
Assam MLAs 1996–2001
Assam MLAs 2001–2006
People from Cachar district
Living people
Year of birth missing (living people)